In numerical analysis and scientific computing, the Gauss–Legendre methods are a family of numerical methods for ordinary differential equations. Gauss–Legendre methods are implicit Runge–Kutta methods. More specifically, they are collocation methods based on the points of Gauss–Legendre quadrature. The Gauss–Legendre method based on s points has order 2s.

All Gauss–Legendre methods are A-stable.

The Gauss–Legendre method of order two is the implicit midpoint rule. Its Butcher tableau is:

{| cellpadding=3px cellspacing=0px style="text-align: center;"
| style="border-right:1px solid; border-bottom:1px solid;" | 1/2 || style="border-bottom:1px solid;" | 1/2
|-
| style="border-right:1px solid;" | || 1
|}

The Gauss–Legendre method of order four has Butcher tableau:

{| cellpadding=3px cellspacing=0px style="text-align: center;"
| style="border-right:1px solid;" |  ||  || 
|-
| style="border-right:1px solid; border-bottom:1px solid;" |  || style="border-bottom:1px solid;" |  || style="border-bottom:1px solid;" | 
|-
| style="border-right:1px solid;" | ||  || 
|}

The Gauss–Legendre method of order six has Butcher tableau:

{| cellpadding=3px cellspacing=0px style="text-align: center;"
| style="border-right:1px solid;" |  ||  ||  || 
|-
| style="border-right:1px solid;" |  ||  ||  || 
|-
| style="border-right:1px solid; border-bottom:1px solid;" |  || style="border-bottom:1px solid;" |  || style="border-bottom:1px solid;" |  || style="border-bottom:1px solid;" | 
|-
| style="border-right:1px solid;" | ||  ||  || 
|}

The computational cost of higher-order Gauss–Legendre methods is usually excessive, and thus, they are rarely used.

Intuition 

 , 

To maintain truncation error of order , we only need  to order . The Runge-Kutta implicit definition  is invoked to accomplish this. This is an implicit constraint that must be solved by a root finding algorithm like Newton's method.

Practical example 
The Gauss-Legendre methods are implicit, so in general they cannot be applied exactly. Below is a Matlab function which implements the Gauss-Legendre method of order four.
% starting point
x = [ 10.5440; 4.1124; 35.8233];

dt = 0.01;
N = 10000;
x_series = [x];
for i = 1:N
  x = gauss_step(x, @lorenz_dynamics, dt, 1e-7, 1, 100);
  x_series = [x_series x];
end

plot3( x_series(1,:), x_series(2,:), x_series(3,:) );
set(gca,'xtick',[],'ytick',[],'ztick',[]);
title('Lorenz Attractor');
return;

function [td, j] = lorenz_dynamics(state)
  % return a time derivative and a Jacobian of that time derivative
  x = state(1);
  y = state(2);
  z = state(3);

  sigma = 10;
  beta  = 8/3;
  rho   = 28;

  td = [sigma*(y-x); x*(rho-z)-y; x*y-beta*z];

  j = [-sigma, sigma, 0;
        rho-z, -1, -x;
        y, x, -beta];
end

function x_next = gauss_step( x, dynamics, dt, threshold, damping, max_iterations )
  [d,~] = size(x);
  sq3 = sqrt(3);
  if damping > 1 || damping <= 0
    error('damping should be between 0 and 1.')
  end

  % Use explicit Euler steps as initial guesses
  [k,~] = dynamics(x);
  x1_guess = x + (1/2-sq3/6)*dt*k;
  x2_guess = x + (1/2+sq3/6)*dt*k;
  [k1,~] = dynamics(x1_guess);
  [k2,~] = dynamics(x2_guess);

  a11 = 1/4;
  a12 = 1/4 - sq3/6;
  a21 = 1/4 + sq3/6;
  a22 = 1/4;

  error = @(k1, k2) [k1 - dynamics(x+(a11*k1+a12*k2)*dt); k2 - dynamics(x+(a21*k1+a22*k2)*dt)];
  er = error(k1, k2);
  iteration=1;
  while (norm(er) > threshold && iteration < max_iterations)
    fprintf('Newton iteration %d: error is %f.\n', iteration, norm(er) );
    iteration = iteration + 1;
   
    [~, j1] = dynamics(x+(a11*k1+a12*k2)*dt);
    [~, j2] = dynamics(x+(a21*k1+a22*k2)*dt);
   
    j = [eye(d) - dt*a11*j1, -dt*a12*j1;
         -dt*a21*j2, eye(d) - dt*a22*j2];
    
    k_next = [k1;k2] - damping * linsolve(j, er);
    k1 = k_next(1:d);
    k2 = k_next(d+(1:d));
   
    er = error(k1, k2);
  end
  if norm(er) > threshold
    error('Newton did not converge by %d iterations.', max_iterations);
  end
  x_next = x + dt / 2 * (k1 + k2);
end
This algorithm is surprisingly cheap. The error in  can fall below  in as few as 2 Newton steps. The only extra work compared to explicit Runge-Kutta methods is the computation of the Jacobian.

Time-symmetric variants 
At the cost of adding an additional implicit relation, these methods can be adapted to have time reversal symmetry. In these methods, the averaged position  is used in computing  instead of just the initial position  in standard Runge-Kutta methods. The method of order 2 is just an implicit midpoint method.

 
 

The method of order 4 with 2 stages is as follows.

 
 
 

The method of order 6 with 3 stages is as follows.

Notes

References 
 .

Runge–Kutta methods